Artur Paulo Oliveira da Silva (born 24 December 1968 in Guimarães), known as Best, is a Portuguese retired footballer who played as a goalkeeper.

Club career
After unsuccessfully graduating at FC Porto's youth system, Best joined neighbouring S.C. Salgueiros in 1988 at nearly 20, going on to spend the following seven seasons with the Paranhos side, five of those in the Primeira Liga. His best output in the competition consisted of 12 games, in 1990–91 (eight goals conceded).

In the summer of 1996, after one unassuming top division campaign with Leça FC, Best signed for F.C. Tirsense in the second level, going on to experience three consecutive relegations with the same team. He retired from football in 2003 at the age of 34, after one-year spells with two amateur clubs.

External links

1968 births
Living people
Sportspeople from Guimarães
Portuguese footballers
Association football goalkeepers
Primeira Liga players
Liga Portugal 2 players
Segunda Divisão players
Vitória S.C. players
FC Porto players
S.C. Salgueiros players
Leça F.C. players
F.C. Tirsense players
Portugal youth international footballers